The name Helderberg, meaning bright or clear mountain in Afrikaans and Dutch,  may refer to:

The Helderberg wine-producing region in the Western Cape, South Africa
The Helderberg Mountain for which the above region is named
The Boeing 747 named Helderberg on Flight SA 295 that crashed near Mauritius in 1987
The container ship SA Helderberg
The Helderberg Escarpment, at the northern end of the Catskill Mountains near Albany, New York, USA
The Helderberg Formation, a geologic formation in Pennsylvania, Maryland and West Virginia, US
The Helderberg Mountains, a mountain range in New York

See also
Heldeberg